Paul John Kittredge (1904-1947) was a professional football player who spent 2 seasons in the National Football League with  the Boston Bulldogs in 1929.

Notes

1904 births
Players of American football from Massachusetts
Boston Bulldogs (NFL) players
Holy Cross Crusaders football players
1947 deaths